The 2021 Royal Bernard Drôme Classic was the 8th edition of the Royal Bernard Drôme Classic cycle race. It was held on 28 February 2021 as a category 1.Pro race on the 2021 UCI Europe Tour and the 2021 UCI ProSeries. For the first time since 2014, the race did not start and/or finish in Livron-sur-Drôme. Instead, the race started and finished in nearby Eurre and featured five climbs, including a triple ascent of the Mur d'Eurre, the last of which summited with five kilometers left. It formed a pair of races on the same weekend with the 2021 Faun-Ardèche Classic, held on the previous day, with both races being organized by Boucles Drôme Ardèche.

Teams 
Eleven of the nineteen UCI WorldTeams, seven UCI ProTeams, and three UCI Continental teams made up the twenty-one teams that participated in the race. All but two teams entered the maximum of seven riders;  entered six and  entered five, for a total of 144 riders, almost all of whom contested the previous day's Faun-Ardèche Classic. 125 riders finished.

UCI WorldTeams

 
 
 
 
 
 
 
 
 
 
 

UCI ProTeams

 
 
 
 
 
 
 

UCI Continental Teams

Result

References

External links 
 

Royal Bernard Drôme Classic
Royal Bernard Drôme Classic
Royal Bernard Drôme Classic
2021
Royal Bernard Drôme Classic